Hajji Murad, also Hacı Murat, was an Ottoman Empire ambassador to France in the 16th century. Hajji Murad and his retinue travelled to France in 1565, on board a galley headed for Malta and then on two galliots which landed in Marseilles in May 1565.

One of the missions of Hajji Murad was to claim back money which had been loaned to France by the Ottoman banker Joseph Nasi and the Ottoman Empire, from the time of Francis I, for an amount exceeding 150,000 écus. Charles IX met him in Bayonne on June 18. It seems Murad also discussed the ongoing Siege of Malta.

See also
 Franco-Ottoman alliance

Notes

References
 Kenneth M. Setton The Papacy and the Levant (1204-1571) DIANE Publishing, 1984 

Ambassadors of the Ottoman Empire to France
16th-century diplomats
16th-century people from the Ottoman Empire